HTI may refer to:
 Hti, the finial ornament placed on pagodas and temples in Myanmar
 HTI+, a former technician certification from CompTIA
 Great Barrier Reef Airport, on Hamilton Island, Queensland, Australia
 Haiti, a country in the Caribbean
 Hamilton Theatre Inc., a community theatre company in Hamilton, Ontario, Canada
 Heads Teachers and Industry, a training programme in the United Kingdom
 Higher Technical Institute of Cyprus, now part of the Cyprus University of Technology
 Higher Technological Institute, a college in Cairo, Egypt
 Hoti language, an extinct language of Indonesia
 Hutchinson Technology, a manufacturer of disk drive components
 Hypoxic Training Index, in respiration therapy